Raiganj  railway station serves Raiganj city in Uttar Dinajpur district in the Indian state of West Bengal.

History
 was connected to Parbatipur, now in Bangladesh, in 1889, by Assam Behar State Railway.

With the partition of India, links with East Pakistan were lost. The Barsoi–Radhikapur sector became a branch line. In the early 1960s, when Farakka Barrage was being  constructed, a more radical change was made. Indian Railways created a new broad-gauge rail link from Calcutta.

The -long Farakka Barrage carries a rail-cum-road bridge across the Ganges. The rail bridge was opened in 1971 thereby linking the Barharwa–Azimganj–Katwa loop to Mala Town,  and other railway stations in North Bengal.

List of available trains
Raiganj railway station is on the Barsoi–Radhikapur branch line. One express train Radhikapur Express & Kulik Express are available for reaching Kolkata. Besides these couple of Katihar bound local passenger trains and a Siliguri-bound DMU passenger and Radhikapur - Telta DMU can also be availed. Present C.M of West Bengal Mamata Banerjee during her reign as a railways minister announced couple of railways projects for Raiganj which will definitely boost the communication.
Raiganj–Dalkhola line (43.43 km)
Raiganj–Itahar–Gazole line

Future upgrades
Raiganj is pretty backward in terms of railway communication. The station is situated on Barsoi–Radhikapur branch line and only a handful of trains pass. But, the railway ministry has sanctioned couple of projects which will convert Raiganj railway station to a Railway Junction. The projects when completed will provide direct links to Malda Town railway station and also to Dalkhola railway station and thus will greatly boost the communication. The projects are in initial stages and only 30% of work has been completed.

Amenities
Raiganj railway station has the following amenities:
Computerized reservation system
Waiting room
Retering room
Book stall
Meal stalls

References

External links
Trains at Raiganj railway station
 

Katihar railway division
Railway stations in Uttar Dinajpur district
Railway stations in India opened in 1889
Raiganj